Brantingtorget (Swedish: "Square of Branting") is the courtyard of  the  Chancery House annex (Kanslihusannexet), acting as one of the public squares in Gamla stan, the old town in central Stockholm, Sweden.

History
The square is named after the country's first democratically elected Prime Minister Hjalmar Branting (1860–1925). It was designed together with the surrounding building by the architect Artur von Schmalensee (1900–1972) and built in 1945–1950. 

It is connected to surrounding streets by several passages, of which some are the remains of alleys once criss-crossing the block – Klockgjutargränd, Kolmätargränd, and Stenbastugränd. The dramatic contrast between the narrow alleys and the relatively large round open space they hide, is astonishingly harmonic, the result of a compromise between the will of antiquaries wanting to preserve the medieval architecture and that of the department wanting to displace what it regarded as slum in disrepair. The post-WW2 classicism of the place excited a mode of indignation among other contemporary architects, claiming modern democracy had dressed itself up in a disguise. 

Centred on the square is the bronze sculpture Morgon from 1962  by Ivar Johnsson (1885-1970).

See also 
 List of streets and squares in Gamla stan

References 

Squares in Stockholm